The Church of the Holy Angels is an Anglican church in Hoar Cross, Staffordshire, England. It is a Grade I listed building.

History

It was built by the pious Anglo-Catholic, Emily Charlotte Meynell Ingram (sister of Charles Wood, 2nd Viscount Halifax) in memory of Hugo Francis Meynell Ingram who died in May 1871. The architects were George Frederick Bodley and Thomas Garner. Work started in 1872 and the church dedication took place on 22 April 1876. Further extension and additions took place until the church achieved its present form in 1906.

John Betjeman described the church as "the masterpiece of its late Victorian architect G.F. Bodley" and "great architecture; original, well massed, well sited, well detailed; very English".

Present day
From 2008, the Church  received alternative episcopal oversight from the Bishop of Ebbsfleet, as the parish does not accept the ordination of women to the priesthood or episcopate. This oversight was transferred in 2023 to the Bishop of Oswestry.

Organ

The organ was originally built by Samuel Green in 1779 for Bangor Cathedral. It was installed in Hoar Cross by Bishop and Son in 1876 and enlarged by Conacher in 1935. As a result of a very generous donation, it  underwent extensive repair and finished at the end of 2012. An electronic organ was used temporarily for services. The specification of the pipe organ can be found on the National Pipe Organ Register at.

Timeline

 1872 Construction started
 1876 Services start in April
 1891 North side Lady Chapel added
 1900 South side All Souls Chapel added
 1906 Narthex added
 1935 Bells rehung and organ enlarged

Gallery

See also
 List of Grade I listed buildings in Staffordshire
 Grade I listed churches in Staffordshire

References

The Church of the Holy Angels, Hoar Cross. Church guidebook. 4th edition 1996.
Pevsner, N. (1974) Staffordshire The Buildings of England. Penguin Books

External links

 Church website 

Tourist attractions in Staffordshire
Church of England church buildings in the Borough of East Staffordshire
Gothic Revival church buildings in England
Holy Angels, Hoar Cross
Grade I listed churches in Staffordshire
Anglo-Catholic church buildings in Staffordshire
Hoar Cross
George Frederick Bodley church buildings